The Bali Nine were a group of nine Australians convicted for attempting to smuggle  of heroin out of Indonesia in April 2005. The heroin was valued at around 4 million and was bound for Australia. Ringleaders Andrew Chan and Myuran Sukumaran were sentenced to death and executed on 29 April 2015. Six other members, Si Yi Chen, Michael Czugaj, Tan Duc Thanh Nguyen, Matthew Norman, Scott Rush and Martin Stephens, were sentenced to life imprisonment and another, Renae Lawrence, to a 20-year sentence but was released after the sentence was commuted in November 2018. The Indonesian authorities reported on 5 June 2018 that Tan Duc Thanh Nguyen had died of stomach cancer.

Background and arrests
Australian police were unclear how the two groups from Sydney and Brisbane were linked, but did establish the movements of members of the group before their departure for Indonesia. Several of the Bali Nine were employed by Eurest Australia, a multinational catering company with more than 9,000 employees. Norman, Lawrence, Stephens and Chan, the latter a supervisor with the company, all worked for Eurest, which provided hospitality services to the Sydney Cricket Ground, where the group was employed. Rush and Czugaj alleged they were recruited by Tan Duc Thanh Nguyen, their co-defendant and the alleged financier of the smuggling plan, while socialising at a karaoke bar in Brisbane.

Evidence was heard that Rush had met Nguyen six months earlier while fishing. He then travelled to Sydney with Nguyen to attend a 21st birthday party where he was introduced to Sukumaran, who called himself "Mark". It was alleged Nguyen offered them free trips to Bali. Several days later Rush and friend Czugaj returned to Sydney, where arrangements were made for them to travel to Indonesia. The Australian Federal Police (AFP) concluded that Sukumaran, Chan, Lawrence and Norman were part of a larger syndicate that successfully imported a commercial quantity of heroin into Australia from Indonesia on 23 October 2004. Other members of the syndicate were arrested in 14 AFP raids in Sydney and Brisbane on the same day in early May 2005.

Arrests in Indonesia
Lawrence and Stephens arrived in Indonesia on 6 April 2005, followed by Rush and Czugaj, old school friends from Brisbane, who arrived two days later. The group was introduced at a hotel where Chan and Sukumaran were staying, having arrived in Bali earlier.

Chan and Sukumaran handed out SIM cards to stay in contact. During their stay, police noted the group would spend a large amount of time in their hotel rooms, although Rush and Czugaj did make the most of their time in Bali and went shopping, eating, drinking and playing water sports. The group met again on 16 April for what police allege was a final briefing, before meeting for their final time at the airport before their 17 April arrest. After receiving information from the AFP about the group, including the names, passport numbers and information relating to their links to possible illegal drug trade, Indonesian police placed the group under constant surveillance for a week before their arrest.

The group was arrested on 17 April. On the same evening, Chan was removed from an Australian Airlines flight about to depart Ngurah Rai Airport for Australia. Chan had several mobile phones in his possession, but was carrying no drugs when arrested. He was believed to be the person responsible for collecting the heroin from the couriers upon their arrival in Australia.

Indonesian police believe a 22-year-old Thai woman, Cherry Likit Bannakorn, supplied Chan with the heroin. She was believed to have left Bali on 18 April 2005, a day after the nine Australians were arrested, and was briefly detained at the Thai-Malaysian border, but released as the paperwork needed for her to be extradited to Indonesia was not available.

Head of the surveillance team I Nyoman Gatra later testified in court during trials for the accused that police were initially unaware Sukumaran was part of the group, because original information obtained from the AFP did not mention him by name. Indonesian police assumed Sukumaran was Chan's bodyguard as he was seen to accompany Chan in Bali.

Criminal proceedings

Pre-trial investigation 
Indonesian law does not require that arrested people be immediately charged with an offence, and by 22 April 2005 no charges had yet been laid. Police indicated that the five arrested at the airport would be charged with drug trafficking, which carries the death penalty, while those arrested in the hotel would be charged with the lesser offence of drug possession, which carries a maximum penalty of ten years' imprisonment. It was suggested that Andrew Chan recruited the other eight to act as drug mules – couriers who would not arouse suspicion while carrying heroin to Australia – and offered them A$10,000 to A$15,000 each to carry out this task, and given A$5000 spending cash.

On 27 April 2005, Colonel Bambang Sugiarto, head of the Bali police drug squad, said police would seek to have all nine charged with offenses which carry the death penalty. He revealed that several of the nine had previously visited Bali using false passports, suggesting that they had acted as drug couriers before. Indonesian police released video evidence showing heroin being removed from the bodies of the four arrested at the airport. Indonesian police initially maintained that Chan was the "mastermind" of the importation plan.

Australian police said that they believed that an Australian drug syndicate was behind the plan. It was soon decided that Myuran Sukumaran, not Chan, was the real leader of the smuggling plot. Defence lawyers conceded that the four arrested at the airport were acting as drug couriers, but said they did it for the money to help their low-income families and because they were threatened with physical harm if they did not comply. They also said they did not know what they were transporting and did not know that drug trafficking in Indonesia carried the death penalty.

Reactions in Australia
The parents of Rush and Lawrence criticised the AFP for allowing the Indonesian police to arrest the nine rather than allowing them to fly to Australia and arresting them in Sydney upon their return. On 24 April 2005, AFP Commissioner Mick Keelty said the AFP would hand over all evidence it had obtained against the Bali Nine:

Lawrence's father, Bob Lawrence, said in October 2005 that he wanted to meet Keelty face to face after learning of the comments made by Lee Rush:

On 13 February 2006, Rush's parents gave an interview to the ABC TV program Australian Story, speaking out against AFP actions. Rush's parents were quoted as saying:

In an interview aired on the same episode of Australian Story, Mike Phelan of the AFP responded to the Rush family's criticisms and said:

Keelty went on to state that "if someone went back to Lee Rush and assured him that Scott would not be able to travel then that is their call."

Federal justice minister Chris Ellison, defended the AFP's actions:

The Foreign Minister, Alexander Downer, said that Australia opposed the death penalty and would seek clemency for the group if they were convicted.

Philip Ruddock, a federal MP, was quoted as saying:

Criminal trials
Criminal trials for the accused commenced in the Denpasar District Court on 11 October 2005. Three of the four arrested at the Melasti Bungalows, Nguyen, Chen and Norman, were tried together, with the remaining six defendants tried separately. All defendants faced a maximum penalty of death by firing squad if found guilty. The trials were often delayed due to the defendants complaining of illness, headaches and nausea. Australia's prime minister, John Howard, said the Australian government would oppose any death sentences imposed.

On 6 December 2005, Australian lawyers Robert Richter QC and Brian Walters QC called for the Commonwealth Director of Public Prosecutions to extradite the nine to Australia on heroin conspiracy-related charges. On 7 December 2005, Denpasar District Court judge I Wayan Yasa Abadhi called for Australians not to interfere in the legal proceedings in Indonesia, saying:
{{quotation|"Criticism from outside is expected, but Indonesian courts will only adhere to the laws applied in this country, and that includes the death penalty. The judges will not budge, we will not be affected by public opinion or the media."|Denpasar District Court Judge I Wayan Yasa Abadhi, December 2005.}}

Sukumaran remained mostly silent throughout the proceedings and blamed amnesia for his poor recollections of events leading to his arrest. Trials were scheduled to be completed with verdicts announced before 23 February 2006, before a legal deadline for the group's detention expired.

Lawrence claimed that she received threats of harm against herself and her family if she did not proceed with the plan to import heroin into Australia; she gave evidence in the Denpasar District Court, that she was ordered to book a flight to Bali. She claimed she did not know why she was ordered to travel and her colleague Stephens claims he was also ordered with threats to travel to Bali by Chan, who showed him some photographs of his family, as they were going about their daily lives, saying that they would be killed if he did not co-operate.

Rush further accused Chan of strapping the heroin to his body wearing rubber gloves. Chan protested his innocence and defending his silence during his final plea, reading from a two-page statement:

In sentencing Lawrence, the judges found no evidence to support her claim that her life was threatened and although the prosecutors requested a lighter 20-year sentence due to her early cooperation with police, the judges sentenced her to life imprisonment. On the next day, the remaining three defendants, Chen, Nguyen and Norman, were sentenced to life imprisonment as well. On 24 January 2006, the prosecutors demanded the death penalty for Sukumaran, this being the first time that a demand of death was put forward for any of the Bali Nine. They told the Bali court that there was no reason to show any leniency to the 24-year-old, because he helped organize the heroin smuggling operation. The prosecutors also claim that it was Sukumaran who strapped heroin to the bodies of his fellow accused. Indonesian police identified Sukumaran as one of the main players, in what they said to be a major smuggling ring. On 26 January, it was also recommended that Andrew Chan receive the death penalty.

On 14 February 2006, after learning of his fate, Sukumaran attacked photographers and threw water bottles at protesters and onlookers gathered outside the court building.

After news that the death penalty had been handed down, then-Australian Prime Minister John Howard, noting that the death penalty warnings had been in place in Indonesia for decades, implored the youth of Australia to take notice and not take such "terrible risks".

The death sentences were criticised by some Australians, who compared them to the light sentence given to Abu Bakar Bashir, the Indonesian leader of the terrorist group which carried out the 2002 Bali bombings that killed more than 200 people including 88 Australians. Both death sentences were cheered by some of those in court.

Allegations of bribery were made on 27 April 2015 relating to Indonesian judicial authorities, to reduce sentences to less than 20 years in prison. A former lawyer for Chan and Sukumaran declared that the original amount demanded was more than 1 billion rupiah (A$133,000), but two weeks before they were due to be sentenced, the "deal" failed and backfired, triggering a request for the death penalty. Julie Bishop, Australia's Minister for Foreign Affairs, expressed her concern over the allegations involving the questioning of the integrity of the judicial process.

Timeline of sentences and appeals

On 13 February 2006, Lawrence and Rush, the first of the nine to face sentencing, were sentenced to life imprisonment. The next day, Czugaj and Stephens were sentenced to life imprisonment, and the group ringleaders, Chan and Sukumaran, were sentenced to death by firing squad, the first ever death sentences imposed by the Denpasar District Court. The other three, Norman, Chen and Nguyen, were all sentenced to life imprisonment on 15 February 2006. On 26 April 2006, Lawrence, Nguyen, Chen, and Norman appealed and had their sentences reduced to 20 years, while the life sentences for Czugaj and Stephens were upheld. Prosecutors launched appeals against the changes in their sentences.

On 6 September 2006, it was revealed that as a result of appeals brought by prosecutors and heard by the Supreme Court, Chen had the death penalty reimposed after his reduced sentence of life imprisonment was overturned. Rush, Nguyen and Norman also had their appeal verdicts overturned and the death penalty imposed. The new death sentences were unexpected. Prosecutors, in their appeals against the 20-year terms faced by most of the nine, had only called for them to be upgraded to life imprisonment. Czugaj's life sentence, after being reduced to 20 years on appeal, was reinstated. Stephens' life sentence was upheld on appeal as were Sukumaran's and Chan's death sentences. Lawrence had not lodged a further appeal to her 20-year sentence, so her sentence was not rejudged.

On 6 March 2008, it was revealed that three of the four Bali 9 (Norman, Chen and Nguyen) who were issued death sentences on appeal had their sentences reduced to life imprisonment. The reduction was not officially announced, but court sources confirm that the judges decided to spare their lives. In August 2010, Rush launched his final appeal to overturn the death penalty, and was granted a judicial review, which commenced on 18 August 2010. On 10 May 2011, Rush's appeal was successful as his sentence was reduced to life imprisonment. On 21 September 2010, the leaders of the drug-smuggling ring, Chan and Sukumaran, appealed against their pending death-row sentence and to reduce their jail time to 20 years, instead of the previous life sentence. On 17 June 2011, it was announced that Chan's final judicial appeal had been rejected on 10 May. On 7 July 2011, it was announced that Sukumaran's final judicial appeal was dismissed. On 10 December 2014, the President of Indonesia Joko Widodo stated in a speech that he would not approve any clemencies for drug offences. On 30 December, Sukumaran's plea for clemency was rejected; and Chan's plea for clemency was rejected on 22 January 2015.

Summary of sentences
All of the Bali Nine were convicted of drug trafficking of heroin.

Appeals
There were several avenues of appeal available to the Bali Nine. Lawyers had seven days post-sentencing to lodge appeals. There is no time limit for those convicted to request clemency from the President of Indonesia, but this requires an admission of guilt and had never been granted for a drug crime until 2009. All appealed to overturn their sentence. The sentences of Chen, Czugaj, Nguyen, Norman and Stephens stand at life imprisonment and Lawrence's sentence remains at 20 years after appeal. In May 2011, Rush's death sentence was reduced to life after he launched a final appeal in August 2010.

Chan and Sukumaran launched final appeals to have their death sentences reduced in August 2010. Chan lost his appeal to the Indonesian Supreme Court on 10 May 2011 and Sukumaran's appeal was dismissed on 6 July 2011. Both made pleas for clemency to the Indonesian President that were rejected in December 2014 and January 2015.

In late January 2015, lawyers for Chan and Sukumaran filed an application for a judicial review into their cases; which was rejected by the Denpasar District Court a few days later. Meanwhile, with a spokesperson for the Indonesian Attorney General stating that requests for judicial review did not preclude the execution process proceeding, Indonesian officials continued planning for the imminent execution of Chan and Sukumaran:

On 9 February 2015, lawyers for Chan and Sukumaran launched a rare challenge against the Indonesian president's refusal to grant them pardons; which was dismissed by the Indonesian government a day later.

On 6 April 2015, an Indonesian court rejected an appeal by Chan and Sukumaran, ruling that they could not challenge the decision by the Indonesian president to grant them clemency in court. One of their lawyers announced that a further appeal would be lodged with the Indonesian Constitutional Court to examine Widodo's refusal to give clemency. However, the Indonesian Attorney-General accused the lawyers of simply trying to buy time, and announced that there would be no more delays to the executions.

Execution of duo
Chan and Sukumaran were executed by firing squad early on 29 April 2015 on Nusa Kambangan prison island, along with six other prisoners convicted for drug offences. The six other men were Zaenal (or Zainal) Abidin (an Indonesian), Rodrigo Gularte (a Brazilian), and four Nigerians: Sylvester Obiekwe Nwolise, Raheem Agbaje Salami, Okwudily (or Okwudili) Oyatanze and Martin Anderson. Filipina Mary Jane Veloso was given a last-minute stay of execution following a pending investigation initiated in her home country about a drug trafficking syndicate in which she is expected to testify.

The executions were widely supported among the Indonesian public, while foreign diplomats protested against them.

Reaction in Australia
A candlelight vigil hosted by the Mercy Campaign, entitled Music for Mercy, was held in Sydney's Martin Place on the evening of 29 January 2015 in support of Chan and Sukumaran. The concert featured performances by Archibald Prize artist Ben Quilty, musicians Megan Washington, Josh Pyke, Kate Miller-Heidke, Paul Mac, Glenn Richards from Augie March, and The Presets' and Julian Hamilton; with media personalities Andrew Denton and his partner Jennifer Byrne and musician Missy Higgins who recorded video messages of support for Chan and Sukumaran.

An academic at Swinburne University in Melbourne expressed in a lecture following the executions of Chan and Sukumaran that he had planned to ask Indonesian international students to leave his class. He has since apologized for his statements.

A poll was conducted by Roy Morgan Research from 27 February to 1 March 2015. The poll revealed that 53 per cent of Australians opposed the execution of Andrew Chan and Myuran Sukumaran while 47% supported it. Muhammad Prasetyo, Indonesia's attorney general, was reported as saying that there was strong support in Australia for the death penalty.

Related arrests
On 27 April 2005, Indonesian police shot and killed Man Singh Ghale, a known major Indonesian drug trafficker believed to be directly connected to the Bali Nine. Ghale, of Nepali origin, was killed when police stormed his Jakarta home.

Australian Federal Police commissioner Mick Keelty said Ghale was "directly linked" to the Bali Nine. Six men aged between 19 and 25 were arrested and released on bail in Brisbane on drug trafficking charges believed to be associated with the Bali Nine. On 12 February 2006, police arrested Do Hyung Lee, a 25-year-old of South Korean origin, at Brisbane Airport after arriving on a flight from South Korea. Lee was charged with drug trafficking and importation offences and appeared in the Brisbane Magistrates Court on 13 February 2006, the same day the first of the nine accused in Indonesia learned of their fate. Lee was bailed to reappear in court with the five others on 3 April 2006. Keelty told a Senate estimates committee hearing that more arrests were expected.

Prior criminal records and charges
Details of previous criminal convictions of some of the accused were not published during the trial to avoid harming legal defences in Indonesia. Once the Denpasar District Court reached guilty verdicts and issued sentences, it was reported in the Australian media that members of the group had been convicted of offences in Australia before their arrests in Indonesia. In December 2004 Rush pleaded guilty at the Inala Magistrates' Court in Queensland to 16 offences including drug possession, fraud, theft and drunk-driving. A warrant for his arrest in Australia remains in place over the theft of $A4,797 from the Commonwealth Bank via a forged cheque. Czugaj, also of Brisbane, has 14 convictions for offences including theft, wilful damage, traffic offences and fare evasion.

Lawrence and Norman were arrested on 26 March 2005 in New South Wales, while travelling along the Pacific Highway in a stolen Ford Laser after police used road spikes to intercept the stolen vehicle. Both were due to appear in the Gosford Magistrates Court to face car theft- and traffic-related charges. On 26 April 2005, they failed to appear due to their imprisonment in Indonesia a week earlier on 17 April 2005. Lawrence admitted, after her arrest in Indonesia on 17 April 2005, of having visited Bali twice before: in October and November 2004. She and Chan had made an earlier successful run with heroin from Bali to Australia during their October visit. The second delivery, scheduled for December 2004, was aborted when the heroin suppliers failed to deliver. She provided a statement to police saying she was paid $A10,000 for the successful heroin delivery but later retracted her statement.

Reaction after execution
Amnesty International strongly condemned the executions of Chan and Sukumaran together with six other drug-related convicts on 29 April 2015, describing them as "reprehensible". Diana Sayed, Human Rights Lawyer and Crisis Campaigner, said "The death penalty is always a human rights violation, but there are a number of factors that make today's executions even more distressing." The Australian ambassador to Indonesia was recalled after Chan and Sukumaran were executed. Australian Prime Minister Tony Abbott stated that the executions were "cruel and unnecessary", claiming both men had been "fully rehabilitated" during their detention in prison. Opposition leader Bill Shorten agreed, saying he was "disgusted" at the execution.

See also

 List of Australian criminals
 List of Australians imprisoned or executed abroad
 Maritime drug smuggling into Australia

 References 

External links
The Penalty is Death  The first interviews with Andrew Chan and Myuran Sukumaran inside Bali's Kerobokan Prison, The Monthly'', September 2008
''The Age'''s report on the Bali Nine story

21st-century Australian criminals
Australia–Indonesia relations
Australian drug traffickers
Australian people imprisoned abroad
Denpasar
Drug rings
Heroin
Prisoners and detainees of Indonesia
Quantified groups of defendants
Trials in Indonesia
2005 in Australia
2005 in Indonesia
Australian people executed abroad
Executed Australian people
People executed by Indonesia by firing squad